Carolina Alves and Sarah Beth Grey were the defending champions but chose not to participate.

Anastasia Dețiuc and Miriam Kolodziejová won the title after defeating Funa Kozaki and Misaki Matsuda 7–6(7–4), 4–6, [10–5] in the final.

Seeds

Draw

References

External Links
Main Draw

Zubr Cup - Doubles